The Laughing Stock of Indie Rock is the fourth studio album by Solex. It was released via Arena Rock Recording Company on September 28, 2004.

Reception
Heather Phares of AllMusic gave the album 3.5 stars out of 5, calling it "[Solex's] most straightforward, accessible collection of songs yet." Zeth Lundy of PopMatters said, "Solex does not write orthodox songs or function as an acceptable DJ for your next house party." He added, "The Laughing Stock of Indie Rock falls somewhere in between the two, a mash-up of thick, freaky beats and horn-rimmed bedroom indie rock."

Track listing

Personnel
Credits adapted from liner notes.
 Elisabeth Esselink – words, music, production, recording, mixing
 Stuart Brown – vocals
 Geert de Groot – guitar
 Robert Lagendijk – drums

References

External links
 

2004 albums
Solex (musician) albums
Arena Rock Recording Company albums